Derrick Wayne Fletcher (born September 9, 1975) is a former American football guard in the National Football League for the New England Patriots, the Washington Redskins, the Carolina Panthers, and the Jacksonville Jaguars.  He played college football at Baylor University and was drafted in the fifth round of the 1999 NFL Draft. Fletcher played high school football at Aldine High School in Houston. 

1975 births
Living people
American football offensive guards
Baylor Bears football players
New England Patriots players
Washington Redskins players
Carolina Panthers players
Jacksonville Jaguars players
Players of American football from Houston